R. C. Bray (born July 28, 1977 in Chicago) is an American producer and voice actor known for over 250 audiobooks, an Audie Award, Earphones Awards, and Voice Arts Awards winner, Off-Broadway and Edinburgh Fringe Festival performer, and TV and radio commercial narrator.

Early life 
Bray began acting in school plays at the age of fourteen years old. He went on to major in theatre at college and later took a job making commercials where he listened to audiobooks during his daily commute.

Audiobooks

Awards and honors

Awards

"Best of" lists

References

External links 
 Official Web Site
 R.C. Bray at Goodreads
 IMDB Biography

Living people
Audiobook narrators
1977 births